Abu Nechim Ahmed (born 5 November 1988) is an Indian cricketer  who plays for Nagaland in domestic cricket and played for Royal Challengers Bangalore and Mumbai Indians in the Indian Premier League. He is a right-arm fast bowler and right-handed lower order batsman. He captained Assam cricket team in the Ranji Trophy, Vijay Hazare Trophy and Syed Mushtaq Ali Trophy.

Career 
Abu made his first-class debut on 1 December 2005 against Madhya Pradesh at Indore in the 2005–06 Ranji Trophy. From 2010 to 2013 he represented Mumbai Indians in the Indian Premier League. He has represented India at the U-19 level many times, played in the 2006 U-19 Cricket World Cup in Sri Lanka. He had also represented ICL India XI & Royal Bengal Tigers in the now defunct ICL.

He was the joint-leading wicket-taker for Assam in the 2017–18 Ranji Trophy, with twelve dismissals in four matches.

References

External links
 Abu Nechim – Wisden

Indian cricketers
Assam cricketers
Cricketers from Guwahati
1988 births
Living people
East Zone cricketers
Mumbai Indians cricketers
India Red cricketers
Royal Challengers Bangalore cricketers
ICL India XI cricketers
Royal Bengal Tigers cricketers